is a 2009 Japanese animated adventure film produced by OLM, Inc. and distributed by Toho. The film was directed by Kunihiko Yuyama from a screenplay by Hideki Sonoda. It is the twelfth animated installment in the Pokémon film series created by Satoshi Tajiri, Junichi Masuda and Ken Sugimori, and serves as a direct sequel to Pokémon: Giratina & the Sky Warrior (2008). It was released in Japan on July 18, 2009.

In the film, Arceus, a powerful creature known as a Pokémon, awakens from a long slumber to seek justice on the humans that refused to return Arceus its life-giving jewel and attacked it. Through loop quantum cosmology, the spacial distortions caused by Arceus's awakening leads to the conflict between the extradimensional Pokémon Dialga, Palkia, and Giratina. To prevent Arceus from attacking humanity, Dialga sends Pokémon trainers Ash Ketchum, Dawn, and Brock back in time, along with Sheena, a descendant of the man mistakenly believed to have betrayed Arceus.

The theme song of the film is "Kokoro no Antenna" by Shoko Nakagawa.

Plot 
Thousands of years ago, Arceus, a Pokémon believed to have created entire worlds, saved this world from a meteor storm and nearly died with the loss of its sixteen Life Plates. Arceus was saved by a man named Damos, from the wasteland town of Michina, when he returned the plates to Arceus. Feeling pity for the town and in an act of gratitude, Arceus fused five of its plates into the Jewel of Life, which made the land rich and fertile. Arceus asked Damos to return the jewel to him, but Damos, hypnotized by a Bronzong belonging to Damos's lieutenant Marcus, betrayed Arceus and attacked it, as Marcus believed the town would again become a wasteland. Arceus destroyed the temple which was built as a shrine dedicated to it and was forced to go into a long slumber. Arceus intended to judge humanity when it awakened.

When Arceus began to awaken, massive whirlpools of energy formed around it. These distortions brought together the dimensions of two Pokémon that should never have met: Dialga, which rules time, and Palkia, which rules space. Dialga and Palkia then collided with one another in Alamos Town, both mistakenly assuming the other had threatened their territory. This battle affected the Reverse World, the dimension ruled by the Pokémon Giratina, bringing Giratina into the conflict.

In the present, the Pokémon trainers Ash Ketchum, Dawn, and Brock arrive at a lake near the ruined temple. A whirlpool strikes up, threatening the lives of Ash's Pikachu and Dawn's Piplup. Sheena, a descendant of Damos who investigates disruptions in time and space, summons Dialga, who saves Pikachu and Piplup. Giratina arrives, but Ash, who Giratina remembers from their previous encounter, calms Giratina's rage. Sheena believes that Pikachu and Ash are the thunder creature and its master from legend, said to have changed the fate of the town long ago. Palkia arrives to save Dialga from another whirlpool, before the two return to their own dimensions.

Arceus arrives. Sheena offers it the Jewel of Life to calm its wrath, only to discover that the jewel is a fake. Dialga, Palkia, and Giratina arrive to stop Arceus from destroying humanity. Dialga sends Ash, Dawn, Brock, and Sheena back in time to the day when Damos was manipulated into betraying Arceus, where Damos and Marcus fall to their deaths in the collapsing temple. Upon Sheena's request, Dialga sends her and the others further back.

Unaware of Marcus's true role, Sheena tells him everything about the future. Arceus arrives to collect the Jewel of Life from Marcus's scepter, but Sheena is fooled into betraying Arceus when the scepter is empty. Arceus is forced into a pit and is wounded by silver water and electrical attacks, which Arceus became vulnerable to after it gave Damos the jewel. Marcus' intention is to kill Arceus himself to save the future. Sheena and Damos use their abilities to communicate with the other Pokémon to stop the Pokémon under Marcus's control from electrocuting Arceus.

Ash obtains the Jewel of Life. Calmed by Damos's ability, Arceus absorbs the jewel, restoring its own life force, and reversing the time paradox that nearly killed Ash, Dawn, Brock, Sheena, and their Pokémon. Arceus rescues the people and Pokémon from the collapse of the temple. Ash, Dawn, Brock, and Sheena are transported to the present, only to discover that Arceus is still furious and has defeated Dialga, Palkia, and Giratina. Arceus spots Ash and recognizes him due to history's alterations, and reverses the destruction it caused and heals its former adversaries. Ash and the others discover Damos has put them on a mural, thanking them for their help in saving the world and seeing that even without the Jewel of Life, Michina is still fertile due to the people and Pokémon cultivating the land. Dialga, Palkia, Giratina, and Arceus depart for their dimensions, with Arceus realizing that it is truly a part of this world.

Cast

Production 
The film's director, Kunihiko Yuyama, stated that in the film Arceus was depicted as being nature, the Jewel of Life as being the Sun, with the end goal of making people contemplate how the natural world is essential for the survival of all life. In Japan, the movie was distributed by Toho, best known for creating Godzilla. The movie's fictitious setting is based on the Acropolis, Mycenae, Delphi, and the Metéora in Greece, which the director and producers visited in August 2008.

Release

Theatrical run 
The film was released in Japanese theaters on July 18, 2009, opening at #4 in its first weekend, behind the Japanese release of Harry Potter and the Half-Blood Prince (#2) and Kamen Rider Decade: All Riders vs. Dai-Shocker (#1). It became the ninth highest grossing animated film of that year.

Broadcast airing 
In the United States, the English dub aired on Cartoon Network on November 20, 2009. This marks the first time that a Pokémon feature film has made its U.S. debut in the same year as its original Japanese release.

Home media
A Blu-ray released on December 13, 2021 in the UK.

Reception 
Pokemon: Arceus and the Jewel of Life generally got mixed reviews.

Carl Kimlinger, writing for Anime News Network, gave the film an overall grade of B−. He noted the film's similarity to previous Pokémon films, saying: "It is totally inoffensive, reliably entertaining, and completely forgettable. In short, the exact same thing Pokémon movies have been", and added: "Whether that sounds like a promise or a threat to you will determine whether this is something you want to watch." He praised the film's special effects, saying: "The sheer beauty of the film will come as a surprise to even the healthiest, best-watched Pokémon fan out there", but criticized the character designs as "bargain-basement", saying: "the contrast between the television series' two-dimensional designs, with their simple eyes and spiky cliché-hair, and the film's fully-realized three-dimensional world is jarring." Kimlinger concluded: "It's harmless, so long as you discount the gotta-catch-'em-all commercialism and occasional weird polytheistic undercurrent, and has some laudable things to say about the power of the human will to better the world", and recommended Kiki's Delivery Service as a better alternative.

Film Music Central gave it a positive review saying that "Arceus and the Jewel of Life is definitely one of the better films in the series, and it caps off an excellent story arc" and "Definitely watch this one if you get the chance (but make sure you watch the others first for full effect)" HeyUGuys gave it a negative review saying that "This will not appeal to those who once loved the anime television series or those who really love their anime films and it is no surprise that it may, most likely, not see a release in the UK"

Notes

References

External links 

 Official site 
 

2009 anime films
2000s Japanese-language films
Anime films based on manga
Arceus and the Jewel of Life
Animated films about time travel
Toho animated films
Universal Pictures animated films
Viz Media anime
Films directed by Kunihiko Yuyama
OLM, Inc. animated films